Rachel Holmes Ingalls (13 May 1940 – 6 March 2019) was an American-born author who had lived in the United Kingdom from 1965 onwards. She won the 1970 Authors' Club First Novel Award for Theft. Her novella Mrs. Caliban was published in 1982, and her book of short stories Times Like These in 2005.

Ingalls's short story "Last Act: The Madhouse" inspired the story of the character Jean in the 1997 film Chinese Box by Wayne Wang.

Personal life
Ingalls was born on 13 May 1940, in Boston and grew up in Cambridge, Massachusetts where her father was a professor at Harvard. She received her B. A. degree from Radcliffe College in 1964, and immigrated to England. 

She was the daughter of Phyllis (née Day) and the late Sanskritist Daniel Henry Holmes Ingalls, Sr., and the sister of the computer scientist Dan Ingalls.

Ingalls died from multiple myeloma under hospice care in London on 6 March 2019, at age 78.

Literary reputation 
Ingalls' reputation is characterised by deep admiration and acclaim but also a certain degree of obscurity. She has referred to her limited commercial success as being due to the ''very odd, unsalable length" of her books, which tend to be story collections or novellas. She was awarded the Authors' Club First Novel Award for her book Theft. In 1986 the British Book Marketing Council named the hitherto little known Mrs Caliban as one of the 20 greatest American novels since World War II, sparking wider interest in both book and writer. Earlier praise for Mrs Caliban came from John Updike. The writer Daniel Handler is an advocate of Ingalls' work.

Bibliography 
 Theft (1970). London: Faber.  
 The Man Who Was Left Behind and Other Stories (1974). London: Faber. 
 Mrs. Caliban (1982). London: Faber.  
 Binstead's Safari (1983). London: Dent.  
 Three of a Kind (1985). London: Faber. 
 The Pearlkillers (1986). London: Faber. 
 The End of Tragedy (1987). London: Faber. 
 Four Stories (1987). London: Faber. 
 Days Like Today (2000). London: Faber. 
 Times Like These (2005). Saint Paul, Minn: Graywolf Press.  
 Black Diamond (2013). London: Faber and Faber.  
In 2017 Pharos Editions published a collection of Ingalls' stories selected and introduced by Daniel Handler under the title Three Masquerades: Novellas.

References

Further reading

Notes

1940 births
2019 deaths
20th-century American novelists
20th-century American women writers
21st-century American novelists
21st-century American women writers
American emigrants to England
American women novelists
Deaths from cancer in England
Deaths from multiple myeloma
Novelists from Massachusetts
Radcliffe College alumni
Writers from Boston
Writers from Cambridge, Massachusetts
Writers from London